Immaculate Akello (born in 1996) is a Ugandan social entrepreneur, climate change activist, Human rights activist and lawyer whose main aim is to transform the lives of rural women in northern Uganda. Akello is the founder of Generation Engage Network, a youth led organization that focuses on environmental rights and environmental democracy in Northern and Central Uganda. Through this organization, she represented Uganda at the Vijjana Assembly in 2018 in Arusha, Tanzania and she was the speaker of the 2018 National Parliamentary youth moot in Uganda.

Early life and education 
Akello studied Law from Kampala International University and she graduated in May 2019.

Career 
During her time at Kampala International University, Akello was a Member of Parliament for Law, she was also the representative of Persons with Disabilities on the Guild Union. Akolle worked with Centre for Policy Analysis (CEPA) a not-for-profit that advocates for Parliamentary democracy under the parliament of Uganda. Her major focus was on governance and democracy plus the rights of refugees in Uganda.After a month of working with CEPA, she was called on to work with the United Nations on a months contract which was after extended until December 2019.

See also 

 Leah Namugerwa
 Vanessa Nakate
 Nyombi Morris

References 

1996 births
Living people
Climate activists
Youth activists
Ugandan activists
Ugandan people
Ugandan women activists
Ugandan women lawyers